Late Shift is an interactive FMV video game written and directed by Tobias Weber. The participation film technology behind the title was developed by CtrlMovie. The title was screened at many international film festivals, including The New York Film Festival, Raindance Film Festival, and the Festival du nouveau cinéma.

Gameplay
Late Shift is presented much like a regular movie. During the film, the player is able to make choices on behalf of the protagonist. The presentation doesn't pause during the decision making process, so viewers must react in real-time. There are 180 choice points in the feature-film, and the user interaction influences characters and the events of the game and lead the story to one of seven different endings.

Story
The playable character and main protagonist is Matt Thompson, a college student who works as a parking lot attendant. One night, Matt finds himself embroiled in London's criminal underworld when he is forced to work with a group of armed robbers. He ends up befriending, possibly romantically, one of the members of the group; a young woman named May-Ling. The player's choices influence the events of the game and can lead to a variety of different endings resulting in different fates for Matt and May-Ling.

Cast

Reception

Late Shift received "very positive" reviews on Steam, 72/100 points according to review aggregator Metacritic. The Sunday Times named it "the most important film of the year", The Guardian called it "a digital experience to look out for". The film won many awards, including a BAFTA Cymru Award (Best Game), "Best Mobile/Tablet" and "Most Creative and Original" at Game Connection Development Awards and "Best Narrative" at BIG Festival Brazil. Further it was nominated for an IMG Award, for "Visual Design" and "Action and Adventure Game" at The Independent Game Developers' Association Awards 2017, and for "Writing or Narrative Design" and "Gameplay Innovation" at the 2018 Develop Awards.

Apart from the majority of positive reactions there were also a few critical voices. Vice deemed it an "intriguing failure". Eurogamer noted the game's continuity errors.

References

External links

2017 video games
Adventure games
Full motion video based games
Indie video games
Interactive movie video games
MacOS games
Nintendo Switch games
PlayStation 4 games
Single-player video games
Video games with alternate endings
Wales Interactive games
Windows games
Xbox One games